Danilo Martins Teixeira (born December 2, 1983 in São Paulo) is a Brazilian footballer who currently plays for the Colombian club Llaneros F.C.

Career

Brazil
Teixeira was part of the youth squad at the famed Brazilian team Santos, Uberaba Sport Clube and Clube Atlético Juventus. He subsequently played for both Itumbiara and Cabofriense. He was the leading goalscorer in the Campeonato Paulista Série A2 in 2009 playing for Ferroviária.

United States
Teixeira signed Miami FC in the USSF Division 2 Professional League in 2010, as a result of his professional relationship with Traffic Sports, which owns the American club. He made his debut for the team on August 7, 2010 in a 1–1 tie with the Puerto Rico Islanders.

South Korea
In 2011, Teixeira has signed for Ulsan Hyundai Mipo Dockyard in the National League, the second division of South Korean football league system. He became the league top goalscorer in the season with 10 goals.

References

External links
 Miami FC bio

1983 births
Living people
Brazilian footballers
Brazilian expatriate footballers
Associação Ferroviária de Esportes players
Itumbiara Esporte Clube players
Associação Desportiva Cabofriense players
Uberaba Sport Club players
São José Esporte Clube players
Miami FC (2006) players
USSF Division 2 Professional League players
Korea National League players
Brazilian expatriate sportspeople in South Korea
Expatriate soccer players in the United States
Expatriate footballers in South Korea
Expatriate footballers in Oman
Brazilian expatriate sportspeople in the United States
Brazilian expatriate sportspeople in Oman
Llaneros F.C. players
Clube Atlético Joseense players
Association football forwards
Footballers from São Paulo